Islamic clothing is clothing that is interpreted as being in accordance with the teachings of Islam. Muslims wear a wide variety of clothing, which is influenced not only by religious considerations, but also by practical, cultural, social, and political factors. In modern times, some Muslims have adopted clothing based on Western traditions, while others wear modern forms of traditional Muslim dress, which over the centuries has typically included long, flowing garments. Besides its practical advantages in the climate of the Middle East, loose-fitting clothing is also generally regarded as conforming to Islamic teachings, which stipulate that body areas which are sexual in nature must be hidden from public view. Traditional dress for Muslim men has typically covered at least the head and the area between the waist and the knees, while women's islamic dress is to conceal the hair and the body from the ankles to the neck. Some Muslim women also cover their face. However, other Muslims believe that the Quran does not mandate that women need to wear a hijab or a burqa.

Traditional dress is influenced by two sources, the Quran and hadith. The Quran provides guiding principles believed to have come from God, while the body of hadith describes a human role model attributed to the Islamic prophet Muhammad. The branch of fashion industry influenced by Islamic principles is known as Islamic fashion.

Common practice

Islamic precepts related to modesty (haya) are at the base of Islamic clothing. Adherents of Islam believe that it is the religious duty of adult Muslim men and women to dress modestly, as an obligatory ruling agreed upon by community consensus.

According to the traditional view in Sunni Islam, men must cover from their belly buttons to their knees, though they differ on whether this includes covering the navel and knees or only what is between them. Women have traditionally been encouraged to cover most of their body except for their hands and faces.

An Arabic word strongly associated with Islamic clothing and haya is khimar (خمار), which translates into English as "veil". The veil re-emerged as a topic of conversation in the 1990s when there was concern regarding potential western infiltration of Muslim practices in Islamic countries.

Islamic dress in Europe

Islamic dress in Europe, notably the variety of headdresses worn by Muslim women, has become a prominent symbol of the presence of Islam in western Europe. In several countries the adherence to hijab (an Arabic noun meaning "to cover") has led to political controversies and proposals for a legal ban. The Netherlands government has decided to introduce a ban on face-covering clothing, popularly described as the "burqa ban", although it does not only apply to the Afghan-model burqa. Other countries, such as France and Australia are debating similar legislation, or have more limited prohibitions. Some of them apply only to face-covering clothing such as the burqa, chador, boushiya, or niqab; some apply to any clothing with an Islamic religious symbolism such as the khimar, a type of headscarf (some countries already have laws banning the wearing of masks in public, which can be applied to veils that conceal the face). The issue has different names in different countries, and "the veil" or "hijab" may be used as general terms for the debate, representing more than just the veil itself, or the concept of modesty embodied in hijab.

Although the Balkans and Eastern Europe have indigenous Muslim populations, most Muslims in western Europe are members of immigrant communities. The issue of Islamic dress is linked with issues of migration and the position of Islam in western society. European Commissioner Franco Frattini said in November 2006, that he did not favour a ban on the burqa. This is apparently the first official statement on the issue of prohibition of Islamic dress from the European Commission, the executive of the European Union. The reasons given for prohibition vary. Legal bans on face-covering clothing are often justified on security grounds, as an anti-terrorism measure.

Ayaan Hirsi Ali sees Islam as incompatible with Western values, at least in its present form. She advocates the values of 'Enlightenment liberalism', including secularism and equality of women. For her, the burqa or chador are both a symbol of religious obscurantism and the oppression of women. Western Enlightenment values, in her view, require prohibition, regardless of whether a woman has freely chosen Islamic dress. Islamic dress is also seen as a symbol of the existence of parallel societies, and the failure of integration: in 2006 British Prime Minister Tony Blair described it as a "mark of separation". Visible symbols of a non-Christian culture conflict with the national identity in European states, which assumes a shared (non-religious) culture. Proposals for a ban may be linked to other related cultural prohibitions: the Dutch politician Geert Wilders proposed a ban on hijabs, in Islamic schools, in new mosques, and in non-western immigration.

In France and Turkey, the emphasis is on the secular nature of the state, and the symbolic nature of the Islamic dress. In Turkey, bans apply at state institutions (courts, civil service) and in state-funded education.  In 2004, France passed a law banning "symbols or clothes through which students conspicuously display their religious affiliation" (including hijab) in public primary schools, middle schools, and secondary schools, but this law does not concern universities (in French universities, applicable legislation grants students freedom of expression as long as public order is preserved). These bans also cover Islamic headscarves, which in some other countries are seen as less controversial, although law court staff in the Netherlands are also forbidden to wear Islamic headscarves on grounds of 'state neutrality'. An apparently less politicized argument is that in specific professions (teaching), a ban on "veils" (niqab) is justified, since face-to-face communication and eye contact is required. This argument has featured prominently in judgements in Britain and the Netherlands, after students or teachers were banned from wearing face-covering clothing. Public and political response to such prohibition proposals is complex, since by definition they mean that the government decides on individual clothing. Some non-Muslims, who would not be affected by a ban, see it as an issue of civil liberties, as a slippery slope leading to further restrictions on private life. A public opinion poll in London showed that 75 percent of Londoners support "the right of all persons to dress in accordance with their religious beliefs". In another poll in the United Kingdom by Ipsos MORI, 61 percent agreed that "Muslim women are segregating themselves" by wearing a veil, yet 77 percent thought they should have the right to wear it.

Muslim women's views on hijab 

There are many different views of Muslim women regarding the hijab. Some women believe that the hijab is too constraining, but accept other Muslim women's donning of the garment, whereas other women are against both themselves and other women wearing the hijab due to its "oppressive" nature.  Furthermore, some women embrace the hijab as a way to celebrate their religion and feel that it helps them maintain their intellectuality rather than becoming a sex object in society. Some Muslim women wear the hijab because it has been part of their family tradition, and they do not want to give up something that is sacred to their family. There are women who wear the hijab who do not judge those that do not, and believe it is in all Muslim women's best interest to choose for themselves whether they will don the veil or not.

Pro-hijab
Muslim women do not necessarily view the hijab as an oppressive garment that is forced upon them. Syima Aslam, a Muslim businesswoman from England, feels a special place for the hijab in her heart and feels that it directly connects her to Islam. Although she garners some disdain and disapproval of her choice to wear the hijab from some business partners, she stands firmly by her choice to don the hijab.

Another young woman, Rowaida Abdelaziz, explains that the hijab is something that she has decided to wear herself and she "does not wear it because [she] is submissive". Sarah Hekmati says that the hijab gives her a sense of freedom and that she likes the idea that a man should know a woman through her intellectual prowess rather than her looks.

Interviewing "one of the Muslim hipster trailblazers" Hana Tajima for Vision magazine, writer Suzanne Elliott states that "fashion-conscious Muslims are proving that you can be cool and modest, stylish and individual without compromising faith". Tajima started her own fashion label Maysaa in 2011, and blogs about her far-reaching influences and inspirations. According to Elliott, 26-year-old Tajima "epitomises the new Muslim hipster, glamorous yet edgy, elegant yet quirky. The trend straddles the big cities of the world from London's Dalston to New York's Williamsburg – or the glitz of Dubai."

Anti-hijab

There are some Muslim women who believe that the hijab indeed hinders their personal freedom as a woman. A Muslim woman by the name of Rasmieyh Abdelnabi explains that she decided to stop wearing the hijab because she felt that it was putting too much pressure on her to "represent an entire community". She further explains that she feels that hijab is not representative of Islam but more so of the Arab culture. Another belief of some women that wear the hijab is that it could potentially "strip them of their individuality" and turn them into a figurehead for their religion. Some women do not want to have to deal with this on a daily basis, and it is another reason that some Muslim women have decided to un-veil themselves. In an article written in September 2013, Nesrine Malik explains her discontent with being forced to wear the niqab, a kind of dress that only exposes the eyes, saying, "I would rather no one wore a niqab. I would rather that no woman had effectively to disappear, from a young age, because that is the norm in her family. [...] I would rather that Islam be purged of the niqab and all its permutations." Malik is among the Muslim women who feel as though the act of veiling hides women; she would like to ban the niqab from Islam.

The former Muslim, Ayaan Hirsi Ali, wrote in her book Nomad about the veil: "(...) deliberately marks women as private and restricted property, nonpersons. The veil sets women apart from men and apart from the world; it restrains them, confines them, grooms them for docility. A mind can be cramped just as a body may be, and a Muslim veil blinkers and conditions both your vision and your destiny. It is the mark of a kind of apartheid, not the domination of a race but of a sex."

A recent incident in Germany reflects the extent of the issue on an international scale: "An administrative court in the southern German city of Munich has banned a female Muslim student from wearing a facial veil in class." Although Germany does not have an official ban on the hijab, according to the nation's highest courts federal states have permission to ban Muslim state employees wearing clothing they deem inappropriate. This rule leaves flexibility for German legislators to essentially make their own rules concerning clothing/dress in the country.

Iran is another country with strict rules on the hijab, and many women feel pressured from the government to dress in a certain style. One Iranian woman, Hengameh Golestan, decided to protest the Iranian government through her own artistic display.

Hijab by country

The legal and cultural status of the hijab is different in different countries. Some have banned the wearing of all overt religious symbols, including the hijab (a Muslim headscarf, from the Arabic "to cover"), in public schools or universities or government buildings.

Austria 
In 2017, a legal ban on covering one's face in public (primarily targeting Islamic clothing such as burqa and niqab) was adopted by the Austrian parliament. Additionally, on 16 May 2019, the Austrian parliament placed a ban on "ideologically or religiously influenced clothing which is associated with the covering of the head" in primary schools. This ban directly bans traditional headscarves worn by Muslim women worldwide.

Belgium 
On 31 March 2010 the Belgian Chamber Committee on the Interior unanimously approved legislation instating a nationwide ban on wearing the burqa in public. The proposal was accepted by the Chamber of Representatives on 27 April 2010 with only two abstentions from Flemish Socialist MPs.

Bulgaria 
In 2016, a legal ban on face-covering Islamic clothing was adopted by the Bulgarian parliament.

France 

In April 2011, France became the first European nation to ban face covering in public space. Balaclavas, face-covering niqabs, full-body burqas and carnival masks (outside carnival season) are prohibited, though hijab is permitted in public space, because it doesn't hide the face. The law was passed unanimously asserting that face-covering, including Muslim veils are contrary to the principles of security on which France is founded.
Sharp criticism had accompanied France's nearly year-long debate on banning burqa-style veils, with those opposed saying, among other things, that the entire process has stigmatized the nation's estimated 5 million Muslims – the largest Muslim population in western Europe. They also claim it is a political ploy because only an estimated 1,900 women wear veils that hide the face.

Latvia 
In 2015 Latvia started debates to forbid face-covering clothing with proposed fines up to 150 euro for covering face in public and up to 350 euro for forcing someone to cover face in public. Government of Latvia agreed on the law only in 2017, and forwarded it to Saeima for final confirmation. Since 2018 process hasn't moved forward and law isn't confirmed and operational yet. There are almost no women in Latvia who cover their face and many have pointed out that such law would be redundant.

Netherlands 
The Dutch government parliament in January 2012 enacted a ban on face-covering clothing, popularly described as the "burqa ban". Offenders can be fined up to 390 euro. The prohibition does not apply to face covering that is necessary for the health, safety or the exercise of a profession or practicing a sport. Excluded from the ban are also events such as Sinterklaas, Carnival, Halloween or when a mayor granted an exemption for a particular event. Also excluded from prohibition are places and buildings intended for religious purposes. The prohibition does not apply to passengers in airplanes and airports who are traveling through the Netherlands to their final destination.

Palestine 

In Gaza, Palestinian jihadists belonging to the Unified Leadership (UNLU) have rejected a hijab policy for women.

Turkey 

Turkish women who want to wear the hijab – the traditional Islamic headscarf covering the head and hair, but not the face – to civil service jobs and government offices will be able to do so now that the Turkish government has relaxed its decades-long restriction on wearing the headscarf in state institutions. The new rules, which don't apply to workers in the military or judiciary, came into effect in 2013, and were put into place to address concerns that the restrictions on hijab were discouraging women from conservative backgrounds from seeking government jobs or higher education.   "A dark time eventually comes to an end," Turkish Prime Minister Recep Tayyip Erdogan said in a speech to the parliament. "Headscarf-wearing women are full members of the republic, as well as those who do not wear it."

Syria 
In 2011, Syrian President Bashar Assad reversed a decision that bans teachers from wearing the niqab. The move was seen as an attempt to appease Salafis as he faced down the uprising challenging his secular rule. As a symbol of political Islam, the government had banned the niqab in July 2010. Syria was the latest in a string of nations from Europe to the Middle East to weigh in on the niqab, perhaps the most visible symbol of fundamentalist Sunni Islam.

Pakistan 
In Pakistan, the topic of the hijab is extraordinarily controversial. The veil is constantly a topic of debate and has been for decades now. The Pew Research Center gathered information on several countries, including Pakistan, and came back with results on how people's perceptions of the veil differ across the world. Participants were given pictures of six women wearing different styles of veil along with the question: "What Style of Dress is Appropriate for Women in Public?". The results found that: "In Pakistan, there is an even split (31% vs. 32%) between woman #3 and woman #2, who is wearing a niqab that exposes only her eyes, while nearly a quarter (24%) choose woman #4." The results show that there is still a lot of debate about what type of dress women perceive to be most appropriate, and it seems that the debate will continue to go on for many years to come.

Egypt 

On 8 January 2014, the Pew Research Center conducted a survey of Muslim women in various countries. An overwhelming eighty-nine percent of Egyptian women who responded to the survey believed that women should show their face in public. Ten percent of the survey participants believed that women should be fully veiled when in public. Compared to other countries, Egypt is not as conservative as others, but only fourteen percent of the women surveyed believed that Egyptian women should be able to choose their own clothing. Compared to six other countries, Egypt was last in this category; the statistic (eighty-four percent) suggests that Egyptian women (according to that single survey), do not believe that women should have freedom to choose their clothing. Meanwhile, in Egyptian media, women have always spoken about their freedom and right to wear whatever they want and that no one should be judged based on their outfits.

Saudi Arabia 

Saudi Arabia is one of the few Muslim countries in which women are forced to cover in most parts of the country. While opinion surveys in Saudi Arabia suggests a strong belief that women should be covered, paradoxically there is also a strong belief that women should have the right to choose what they wear.

A survey done in 2011 by the Pew Research Center asked women of different Muslim countries to choose which of several dresses they think are most appropriate for their country. Among Saudi women, 11% of women said a fully headed burqa is most appropriate, 63% of women said the niqab that only exposes the eyes is appropriate, only 8% said a black hijab covering the hair and ears is appropriate, 10% said a less conservative white hijab covering the hair and ears is appropriate, a small 5% said an even less conservative hijab that is brown and shows some hair is appropriate and a mere 3% said not wearing any covering was appropriate. The niqab is the dress that the highest percent of Saudi women felt was appropriate dress for women in Saudi Arabia. In accordance with these statistics, the Saudi woman that is used in the video, cited above, to show the popular view of Saudi women was wearing this niqab that only exposed her eyes.

Somalia 

During regular, day-to-day activities, Somali women usually wear the guntiino, a long stretch of cloth tied over the shoulder and draped around the waist. In more formal settings such as weddings or religious celebrations like Eid, women wear the dirac, which is a long, light, diaphanous voile dress made of cotton or polyester that is worn over a full-length half-slip and a brassiere. Married women tend to sport head-scarves referred to as shash, and also often cover their upper body with a shawl known as garbasaar. Unmarried or young women, however, do not always cover their heads. Traditional Arabian garb such as the hijab and the jilbab is also commonly worn.

Hijab in the Americas

United States 

Most Muslim women in the United States wear hijab at least some of the time. Contrary to popular theories about assimilation, this number is in fact higher among native-born Muslim women compared to first-generation Muslim immigrants.

Despite perceptions of social discrimination against Muslim women, there are no legal restrictions on Islamic modesty garb in the United States, due to universal religious freedom protections in American law. For example, the Supreme Court of the United States ruled against Abercrombie and Fitch when they refused to hire a woman named Samantha Elauf on account of her wearing hijab, stating that the dress code policy violated Elauf's religious freedom. 

As most gyms, fitness clubs, and other workout facilities in the United States are mixed-sex, observant Muslim women must either avoid these facilities or exercise in hijab, which is often impractical. Individuals such as Maria Omar, director of media relations for the Islamic Food and Nutrition Council of America (IFANCA), have thus advised Muslim women to avoid these complexes entirely as being in conflict with Islamic norms.

Canada 

In 2011, the Canadian government made it illegal for women to wear face-covering garments at citizenship ceremonies, because the judge must be able to see each person's face reciting their oath. In 2012, the Supreme Court issued a rare split decision on whether women could cover their faces on the witness stand.  Four judges said it depended on the circumstances, two said witnesses should never cover their face, and one said a Muslim witness should never be ordered to remove her veil. Canada is considering a wider ban on veils in government offices, schools, and hospitals. On June 16, 2019, the provincial government of French-speaking Quebec enacted the Act respecting the laicity of the State. The Act prohibits certain public servants from wearing religious regalia – including Muslim scarves and veils, turbans, Jewish skullcaps and Christian crucifixes.

South America

Argentina 
In 2011 Argentinian President Cristina Fernández pushed for legislation which allowed for Muslim women to wear hijab in public places. According to the new law Argentine Muslim women can wear a hijab while being photographed for their national id cards. The law was created in order to help promote freedom of religion and expression in the country, and help the Muslim population, which is estimated to be between 450,000 and one million, feel more integrated into society.

Chile 
Chile has a minority Muslim population. Fuad Mussa, the President of the Islamic Cultural Centre, is quoted as saying that "there is a general ignorance among Chileans about Islam. This was after a Chilean citizen was refused service at a bank because of her hijab in 2010, and would not be served until she removed her hijab.

See also

References

Further reading
Soravia, Bruna, "Dress", in Muhammad in History, Thought, and Culture: An Encyclopedia of the Prophet of God (2 vols.), Edited by C. Fitzpatrick and A. Walker, Santa Barbara, ABC-CLIO, 2014, Vol I, pp. 153–156.

External links

Islam101: Hijab In The Workplace Q&A
Traditional Islamic Clothing
BBC News: Graphic of the different styles of Muslim headscarf
Islamic Clothing Article (archived 13 July 2015)
Islam Abaya Guide

 
Misogyny
Sexism
Islamic culture
Islamism
Pan-Islamism
Wahhabism
Islamic fundamentalism
Islamic extremism